The following is a timeline of events during the Israeli–Palestinian conflict in 2019. A total of 137 Palestinians were killed, 135 by Israeli forces and two by Israeli settlers. 28 children were killed, 26 boys and two girls. 33 civilians were killed as part of the Great March of Return demonstrations. Ten Israelis were killed by Palestinians and at least 120 were injured.

341 attacks were carried out by Israeli settlers against Palestinians, in which two Palestinians were killed and 115 injured. Palestinian land and property were vandalized, including almost 8,000 trees. The Nablus Governorate was most affected my settler violence, followed by Hebron Governorate and Ramallah Governorate.

February

7 February 
19-year-old Israeli teen Ori Ansbacher from Tekoa was brutally raped and murdered by the Palestinian terrorist Arafat Irfaiya while walking in the Ein Yael forest southwest of Jerusalem.

March

6 March 
A group of settlers escorted by Israeli soldiers stormed the Nabi Yunis Mosque in Halhul north of Hebron. Soldiers fired rubber bullets at Palestinian protestors, injuring two.

17 March 
19-year-old Sgt. Gal Kaiden from Beersheba was stabbed and killed in a terror attack at the Ariel Junction. After stabbing him, the Palestinian terrorist stole his weapon and shot him and two other people in separate locations.

Rabbi Achiad Ettinger, 47, a father of 12 from Eli, was critically wounded while driving past the scene of the terrorist attack. He succumbed to his wounds the following day.

20 March 
Ahmad Jamal Manasra, 23 or 26, from Wadi Fukin was shot and killed by an Israeli soldier at the al-Nashash checkpoint at the southern entrance to the al-Khader village near Bethlehem while trying to provide aid to a Palestinian family.

At around 9:00 pm the Ghayatha family were making their way home to Nahhalin after having visited relatives in Artas. Traveling in the car were 'Alaa, 38, his wife, Maysaa, 34, and their two daughters aged 5 and 8. A dispute developed between 'Alaa and another driver on the road. About 50 meters from the al-Nashash checkpoint he got out of his car to confront the driver. The driver, however, did not stop and kept going but 'Alaa was shot in the stomach by a soldier stationed at a nearby watchtower.

Another car driven by Ahmad Manasra, carrying three other young men, approached the checkpoint at about the same time. They saw Maysaa calling for help and got out of the car to help her. Three of them helped 'Alaa into their own car and took him to a hospital but Manasra stayed behind to comfort Maysaa and her daughters. As he went out of Maysaa's car, he was shot in both hands and in the chest by the same soldier that had shot 'Alaa. He later died of his wounds.

The Israeli military issued a statement saying that stones had been thrown at Israeli cars and the soldier in response shot Ghayatha and Manasra. The Israeli military police conducted an investigation of the incident. In August 2020, it was reported that the Military Advocate General would seek three months of community service for the soldier that killed Manasra as part of a plea bargain.

July

16 July 
Tariq Zebania, 7, from Tarqumiyah northwest of Hebron was struck and killed by a car driven by an Israeli settler as he rode his bike by the settlement road outside the settlement Adhoura.

August

23 August 
17-year-old Rina Shnerb from Lod was murdered while hiking with her family in nature when Palestinian terrorists detonated an IED device. Her father and brother were seriously wounded.

October

11 October 
 49 demonstrators were injured during clashes between hundreds of Palestinian demonstrators and Israeli soldiers in the eastern Gaza Strip close to the border with Israel. 14 of them were children according to the health ministry in Gaza.

November

8 November 
 Thousands of Palestinians protested on the Gaza border and 69 were wounded by Israeli soldiers according go the Gaza health ministry. 29 by live fire. An armored vehicle were hit by a Molotov cocktail.

10 November 
 A 14-year-old Palestinian boy was hit with a tear-gas canister during a Great March of Return demonstration in Gaza. He died of his wounds on 31 January 2020.

22 November 
Israeli settlers raided several villages near Nablus and burnt tens of Palestinian-owned cars.

Notes

References

2019 in Israel
2019 in the State of Palestine
Israeli-Palestinian conflict
Israeli-Palestinian conflict
2019
2019
2019
2019
Terrorist incidents in Israel in 2019